Ambohimandroso is a town and commune in Madagascar. It belongs to the district of Ambatondrazaka, which is a part of Alaotra-Mangoro Region. The population of the commune is not known.

Rivers
It is located at the Onive River.

References and notes 

Populated places in Alaotra-Mangoro